Easyflow was one of the first diagramming and flow charting software packages available for personal computers. It was produced by HavenTree Software Limited of Kingston, Ontario Canada. HavenTree's mark on history for its product, which was subsequently renamed Interactive Easyflow, is its notable plain-English license.

History

HavenTree was formed in 1981. Easyflow, a DOS-based software package, was the initial name of the company's 
flagship offering, which was non-interactive and introduced in 1983. "EasyFlow-Plus" was announced in 1984. Interactive EasyFlow - so named to distinguish it from the preceding products - was offered from 1985 until the early 1990s, when the company dropped the "Interactive" adjective in favour of simply "HavenTree EasyFlow". It offered the software for sale until it filed for protection under Canada's Bankruptcy and Insolvency Act in April 1996. The assets of the company were purchased by SPSS Inc. in 1998.

Historical significance
HavenTree and EasyFlow is mostly remembered today for its counter-cultural disclaimer and end-user license agreement. Both were written in plain English and not in legalese, enabling end users to understand better the terms of these legal agreements, and emphasizing the problems with modern software licensing. Excerpts from the license and disclaimer are included into the fortune databases of many Linux and BSD distributions.

Text of software license

Text of disclaimer

Patenting
Patent entries are dated in the 1990s.<ref><ref>

References

External links
 http://www.geocities.com/Heartland/Plains/4188/sw_doc.html

Diagramming software
Computer humor